Diodontium is a genus of flowering plants in the daisy family.

There is only one known species, Diodontium filifolium, native to Australia (Western Australia, Queensland, and Northern Territory).

References

Monotypic Asteraceae genera
Coreopsideae
Endemic flora of Australia
Taxa named by Ferdinand von Mueller